Denis Barberet (1714–1770) was a French biologist and veterinarian.

He was born in the wine-growing region of Bourgogne. He became a physician at the Faculty of Montpellier and travelled to Italy. In 1743 he established a medical practice at Dijon and then at Bourg-en-Bresse, before practising medicine from 1766 at Toulon and in the military as a doctor in the French Navy. He became known for his scientific memoirs recognized by various learned societies. He compiled comprehensive bibliographies of scientific memoirs and documents.

References

1714 births
1770 deaths
French biologists
French veterinarians
Place of birth missing